The Mirage 29 is a Canadian sailboat, that was designed by Philippe Harlé and first built in 1986.

The Mirage 29 design is often confused with an unrelated design, the British Thames Marine Mirage 29 first built in 1983.

Production
The boat was built by Mirage Yachts in Canada, which completed 290 examples, starting in 1986, but it is now out of production.

Design

The owners of Mirage Yachts, Dick and Irene Steffen, were looking for a newer design to replace the Robert Perry-designed Mirage 27 in the product line. In 1985 the Steffens asked a number of different designers to provide preliminary designs for a boat in the same class. The winner was Philippe Harlé, who was selected to complete his design. It was introduced in the spring of 1986 as the Mirage 29 and became a quick success, with 50 boats sold before the first one had been delivered and 290 built in total. As a result of this success, Harlé went onto design the Mirage 275 in 1986 and Mirage 39 in 1989.

The Mirage 29 is a recreational keelboat, built predominantly of fiberglass, with wood trim. It has a masthead sloop rig, an internally-mounted spade-type rudder and a fixed fin keel. It displaces  and carries  of ballast.

Operational history
In a review Michael McGoldrick wrote, "This boat is an excellent example of the newer boats which were built in the mid to late 1980s (just before most of the sailboat manufacturers in Canada closed their doors). The Mirage 29 has a long waterline, a bow with little overhang, a large but relatively shallow cockpit, an aft head, and aft cabin with a double berth which extends under the cockpit. These are all features found on many French boats which became so popular in the latter half of the 1980s...One of the main attractions of these boats is an enclosed aft cabin...  People over 6 feet tall may find most of the berths on Mirage 29 a little short."

See also

List of sailing boat types

Similar sailboats
Alberg 29
Bayfield 29 
C&C 29
Cal 29
Hunter 290
Island Packet 29
Northwind 29
Prospect 900
Tanzer 29
Thames Marine Mirage 29
Watkins 29

References

External links

Keelboats
1980s sailboat type designs
Sailing yachts
Sailboat type designs by Philippe Harlé
Sailboat types built by Mirage Yachts